Marietta Chrousala (: born March 11, 1983) is a Greek model, entrepreneur and former television presenter.

In 2003, she was crowned Star Hellas and represented her country at the worldwide beauty pageant Miss Universe.

Early life
Chrousala was born on March 11, 1983, in Rizari, a village near Edessa to Kostas and Aglaia Chrousalas, both teachers. She has an older brother, Thanasis (born 1980). In 1985 moved with her family to Athens. In 2001, Chrousala began her studies in the department of Mass Media and Communication at University of Athens from which she graduated. Later, she completed a postgraduate degree from Panteion University and department of Communication's Psychology.

Career

Modeling & Television
In 2003, Chrousala won the title of Star Hellas and then, she was chosen to represent Greece at the Miss Universe 2003 pageant, finishing in fifteenth place. She had already been working voluntarily since 2002 for the 2004 Summer Olympics, while she was chosen after winning her title as one of the celebrities to take part in the Olympic Flame torch relay which finished in Greece.
In 2005, she was the co-host of the TV game show "Poly tin Kyriaki" for its first season on Mega Channel with Grigoris Arnaoutoglou. She left Mega Channel for Alter Channel to make her own show. From 2006 to 2009, she was the main host of the morning gossip show "I Ellada Pezei".
In 2011, she was one of the contestants on the Greek version of Dancing With The Stars at ANT1 with Zeta Makripoulia.
Since 2005, she is ambassador of Seventeen Cosmetics.

Other projects

Business
In 2012, Chrousala decided to set up her own business with handmade sandals based on the ancient Greek element. The office of mariettasfantasy is located in London.

Writing
In 2011 Chrousala and her mother, Aglaia, wrote their own book with cooking tips, "Apo Mitera Se Kori" (From Mother To Daughter).

Personal life
On June 5, 2010, Chrousala married Greek shipowner Leon Patitsas after four years of relationship. They have three children: a daughter Margo Patitsa (born October 24, 2012) and two sons Spyros Patitsas (born March 4, 2015) and Konstantinos Patitsas (born January 6, 2018).

Chrousala and Patitsas live between Athens, London and Miami. They are close friends with Maria Menounos and Kalomira.

Filmography

References

External links

1983 births
Greek beauty pageant winners
Greek female models
Greek television presenters
Lemos family
Living people
Miss Universe 2003 contestants
National and Kapodistrian University of Athens alumni
People from Edessa, Greece
Greek women television presenters